The men's marathon at the 2006 European Athletics Championships were held in Gothenburg, Sweden (at the Ullevi Stadium) on August 13.

2002 winner Janne Holmén finished in seventh place.

Medalists

Schedule

Final ranking

See also
 2006 European Marathon Cup

External links
 Results
 marathonspiegel

Marathon
Marathons at the European Athletics Championships
European Athletics Championships
Men's marathons
Marathons in Sweden